Phyllosticta circumscissa is a plant pathogen, specifically a fungus (micromycete). It affects stone fruit treats predominantly.

References

External links
 USDA ARS Fungal Database

Fungal tree pathogens and diseases
Stone fruit tree diseases
circumscissa
Fungi described in 1883
Taxa named by Mordecai Cubitt Cooke